Aimee Torrefranca-Neri is a Filipina lawyer. She served as Commissioner of the Philippine Commission on Elections or COMELEC from March 8, 2022 until June 2, 2022. Prior to being appointed in the COMELEC, she served as the assistant secretary of the Philippine Department of Justice in 2016, as deputy commissioner of the Philippine Bureau of Immigration in 2017, and as undersecretary of the Philippine Department of Social Welfare and Development in 2018.

Early career 
During her stint at the Mayor's Office of Davao City, she was a special counsel for violence against women and children.

Career 
In 2022, President Duterte appointed Torrefranca-Neri along with two other commissioners to the Philippine Commission on Elections. Torrefranca-Neri failed to retain her post after the Commission on Appointments bypassed her appointment.

Controversies 
Torrefranca-Neri was allegedly a "fixer" while working as assistant secretary of the Philippine Department of Justice under the Duterte administration. Filipino lawyer Ferdinand Topacio claims that convicted drug lord Herbert Colanggo bribed Torrefranca-Neri for 10 million pesos to "fix" a robbery case before the Philippine Supreme Court.

References 

Filipino civil servants
Filipino women lawyers
Duterte administration personnel
Commissioners of constitutional commissions of the Philippines
Living people
Year of birth missing (living people)
People from Davao City
21st-century Filipino lawyers